Vissel may refer to:

 Vissel Kobe, Japanese football club.
 Vissel, a stream in northern Germany.
 "Vissel", a song from Jose González's 2015 album Vestiges & Claws